Zhangjiakou railway station was a station on the Beijing–Baotou railway in Qiaodong District, Zhangjiakou, Hebei. The station was closed in July 2014.

Notes

See also

List of stations on Jingbao railway

Railway stations in Hebei